Wo Hop Shek is an area in the south of Fanling, Hong Kong. It consists of villages and recently developed housing estates. The area is famous for its large public cemetery, Wo Hop Shek Public Cemetery, on the nearby hillside. Every year, during the Ching Ming Festival and Chung Yeung Festival, many people come to visit their ancestors.

Railway
In 1950–1951, a Wo Hop Shek Branch (和合石支線) (in fact only a long siding) of Kowloon–Canton Railway was built to transport bodies of civilians killed in World War II, and later to cater the visitor in Ching Ming Festival and Chung Yeung Festival. The whole single track branch was built upon an embankment. It branched off south of Fanling station, at the start of the curve. The station at Wo Hop Shek was the most modern of all stations in Hong Kong at the time it was built, and instead of being a brick built structure as other stations were, it was of cement and steel. Special vehicles were built to carry the bodies. The branch was abandoned after the railway was electrified in 1983. No traces can be found now of the line, but the site of the station survives as a roundabout. The start of the branch is now marked by a red gate visible on the Fanling side of the Jockey Club Road bridge, which used to be a level crossing.

Gallant Garden
In 1996, Gallant Garden (or Ho Yuen, in Cantonese), in Wo Hop Shek Public Cemetery, was established for the civil servants who die of injuries during their duty. In 2000, permanent earth burial was extended to both civil servants and non-civil servants who died of exceptional bravery on duty. There is also a big Buddhist-Taoist monastery built near the cemetery. There are many shops in the villages which makes stone graves.

Housing estates
They are mostly public housing estates built after 1983, as reflected on the fact that part of the original trackbed of the railway branch is occupied by two of the estates.
Avon Park
Cheong Shing Court
Dawning Views
King Shing Court
Wah Ming Estate
Wah Sum Estate
Yan Shing Court
Yung Shing Court

Villages
Ho Ka Yuen
Wo Hing Tsuen
Wo Hop Shek New Village
Wo Hop Shek Village

Wo Hop Shek Village
Wo Hop Shek is a recognized village under the New Territories Small House Policy.

At the time of the 1911 census, the population of Wo Hop Shek Village was 48. The number of males was 21.

References

External links

 Orthophoto of Wo Hop Shek in Google Map
 Delineation of area of existing village Wo Hop Shek (Fanling) for election of resident representative (2019 to 2022)

 
Restricted areas of Hong Kong red public minibus